Dale Carr (born March 10, 1964) is the former head football coach at Angelo State University and Tyler Junior College.

He first played football at Permian High School. His junior year the team went on to win the Texas 5A State Championship in 1980. He played college football at Colorado State University where he earned first team All-Western Athletic Conference his senior year and was once named Sports Illustrated Defensive Player of the Week.

His first college coaching job was as an assistant coach at Stephen F. Austin State University, where he helped lead the Lumberjacks to the 1989 NCAA Division I-AA Football Championship title game. Because of his previous success he was awarded the head coach position at Tyler Junior College. At Tyler he amassed a 66–31 overall record and led them to five bowl games.

In 2005, he was hired as the head coach at Angelo State University. In his first year, he brought the once prominent, but recent struggling program, to the NCAA Division II playoffs. After three losing seasons in 2009 his team ranked as high as 21st in the nation, yet narrowly missed the playoffs, going 6–5. In 2010 after another disappointing season of 5–5 and 1–6 in the Lone Star Conference South, Angelo State's athletic director announced that Carr's contract and those of his assistants would not be renewed & the university would begin a nationwide search immediately for a new head football coach.

Personal life
Carr is married to Vanessa Carr. They have two children, Alyssa and Benjamin .

Head coaching record

College

References

1964 births
Living people
Angelo State Rams football coaches
Colorado State Rams football players
Stephen F. Austin Lumberjacks football coaches
Tyler Apaches football coaches
People from Odessa, Texas
Players of American football from Texas